Piccolomini is the name of an Italian noble family, prominent in Siena from the beginning of the 13th century.

Piccolomini may also refer to:

People
 Alessandro Piccolomini (1508–1579), Italian humanist and philosopher 
 Ascanio I Piccolomini (died 1597), archbishop of Siena 1588-1597
 Ascanio II Piccolomini (1590–1671), archbishop of Siena 1629-1671
 Costanza d'Avalos Piccolomini (died 1560), duchess of Amalfi
 Enea Silvio Piccolomini (general) (ca.1640–1689), Italian nobleman
 Enea Silvio Bartolomeo Piccolomini, better known as Pope Pius II
 Francesco Piccolomini (Jesuit), Italian Jesuit
 Francesco Todeschini Piccolomini (1439-1503), better known as Pope Pius III
 Giovanni Piccolomini (1475–1537), Italian papal legate and Cardinal
 Jacopo Piccolomini-Ammannati (1422-1479), also known as Giacomo Piccolomini, Italian Renaissance cardinal and humanist
 Joachim Piccolomini (1258-1305), also known as Joachim of Siena or Giovacchino Piccolomini, Italian Servite tertiary from Siena
 María Carla Piccolomini (born 1980), Argentine politician
 Marietta Piccolomini (1834-1899), Italian soprano
 Ottavio Piccolomini (1599–1656), Italian nobleman

Other
 Palazzo Piccolomini, Pienza, Italy
 Piccolomini (crater), a prominent lunar impact crater 
 Piccolomini Altarpiece, an altarpiece in Siena Cathedral, Siena, Italy
 Piccolomini Library, in the Cathedral of Siena, Italy
 Mass in C major, K. 258 by Wolfgang Amadeus Mozart, sometimes known as the Piccolomini Mass

Italian-language surnames